Irv Carlson was a player in the National Football League. He played with the Kenosha Maroons.

References

Year of birth missing
Year of death missing
Kenosha Maroons players
Wisconsin Badgers football players